= Steven Brueck =

American engineer

Steven R. J. Brueck is an American engineer, currently a Distinguished Professor at University of New Mexico. He is a Fellow of the American Association for the Advancement of Science, Institute of Electrical and Electronics Engineers and Optical Society.

== Education ==
- B.S., Columbia University
- M.S. Massachusetts Institute of Technology
- Ph.D., Massachusetts Institute of Technology
